Fuhrmannhaus is the oldest surviving house in the west of Vienna, Austria. It is part of the 14th borough Penzing.

History 

The history of the Fuhrmannhaus can be sourced back to the 17th century by a stair railing from the year 1687. This railing is part of the reconstruction after the Second Viennese Ottoman siege in 1683. At the site of the house, however, there is also evidence of a Roman watchtower and a medieval settlement, where today's Linzer Straße (Linzer Street) applies as an important transport road to Linz since the 12th century. Furthermore, a barred tiny window from the time before 1500 is still preserved in the courtyard of the building. The Fuhrmannhaus has an art-historically valuable small hall with frescoes from the late 17th century. This hall is currently used for cultural events such as classical concerts and readings. Furthermore, the building accommodates a traditional Viennese wine tavern. In the courtyard art exhibitions and different markets are held, such as farmers' and Christmas markets.

In the course of its more than three hundred years of history, the Fuhrmannhaus changed hands several times. Around 1680 it was acquired by the Barnabites who used the building as a farmyard as well as summer quarters for members of the monastery. In 1840, Franz Xaver Fuhrmann bought the house and operated a wagon company for several decades. Since then it remained in the possession of the heirs of the family Fuhrmann and thus received its present name.

Gallery

Literature 
 Felix Czeike: Wiener Bezirkskulturführer, XIV. Penzing. Wien [u.a.], published by Jugend & Volk, page 43, Vienna 1980. (German).

References

External links 

 Official website of the administration of Fuhrmannhaus.
 Article on the website Wien Geschichte Wiki.

Buildings and structures in Penzing (Vienna)
Baroque architecture in Vienna
Houses completed in 1687
Cultural venues in Vienna
Tourist attractions in Vienna